Cherish in Love is a 2014 Chinese romance film directed by Wang Anqing. It was released on December 24.

Cast
Xiang Tian
Liu Changchun
Wang Yufei
Wang Xiaoxi
Su Danping
Liu Yu
Zhu Yingying
Chen Yanwen

Reception
By December 25, 2014, the film had earned ¥0.15 million at the Chinese box office.

References

2014 romance films
Chinese romance films